Earthquakes in Germany are relatively weak but occur several times a year, some of them in coal mining areas where blasting sets them off.  Following a 4.0 quake, attributed to mining and centered in Saarwellingen, around 1,000 demonstrators protested on 24 February 2008, demanding an end to mining work. Reportedly, the tremor knocked over chimneys and caused power outages.

Most of the quakes occur in a seismically active zone associated with the Rhine Rift Valley that extends from Basel, Switzerland, into the Benelux countries, in particular in the "Cologne Bight". There are also earthquake zones on the northern edge of the Alps, around Lake Constance, in the Vogtland, around Gera and in the Leipzig plain.

Geology

Germany is transected by parts of the European Cenozoic Rift System, particularly the Upper and Lower Rhine Grabens, and these areas remain tectonically active today. This zone of intraplate deformation is caused by the continuing effects of the Alpine orogeny as the African Plate continues to push northwards into the Eurasian Plate.

Seismologists consider earthquakes up to 6.4 on the Richter scale theoretically possible in the Lower Rhine Graben seismic zone. Earthquakes there occur sporadically and at magnitudes that are relatively low by international standards. However, the region is the most seismically active and experiences the strongest quakes in Germany. A strong earthquake (approximately 5.5 to 6.0 on the Richter scale) occurs there approximately every 200 years on average. A stronger earthquake would endanger cities including Aachen, Bonn, Düren, Düsseldorf, Grevenbroich, Heinsberg, Koblenz, Cologne, and Leverkusen as well as cities in the Netherlands including Roermond, Maastricht, and Sittard and in Belgium including  Eupen and Liège.

Notable earthquakes

1356 Basel earthquake

On 18 October 1356, an earthquake with its epicentre between Waldkirch and St. Peter in Breisgau-Hochschwarzwald destroyed the city of Basel in Switzerland and killed at least 300 people there alone; there was widespread damage from the quake and its precursor and aftershocks, and the main quake, estimated at 6.2 to 6.5 Mw, was felt as far away as Paris.

1756 Düren earthquake

On 18 February 1756, at about 8 am, one of the strongest earthquakes in Central Europe, the strongest reported in Germany to date, struck Düren. The hypocentre is judged to have been at 14–16 km. It followed the 1755 Lisbon earthquake by several months and was the culmination of a series of quakes in Germany that had lasted several years. Buildings were damaged in Cologne, Aachen, Jülich and Bad Münstereifel; shaking was felt in London, Magdeburg and Strasbourg. Based on damage reports, the quake was assessed at VIII on the Mercalli intensity scale, and is today thought to have been approximately 6.1 or 6.4 on the Richter scale. The earthquake caused two deaths and severe damage in Düren, two deaths and one serious injury in Cologne. Portions of the city walls collapsed in Düren and Bad Münstereifel. Some of the hot springs in Aachen ran dry, while others increased in strength. A spring at Breinigerberg ran dry. The water table fell in open tin and lead mines; some became dry.

1951 Euskirchen earthquake
On 14 March 1951, shortly before 11 am, a magnitude 5.8 quake with epicentre near Euskirchen injured 11 people and caused significant damage. Chimneys and roof tiles fell. Many people in Cologne took refuge in bomb shelters. This earthquake led to the establishment of the earthquake monitoring centre at Bensberg to provide data on seismic activity in the Rhineland.

1992 Roermond earthquake

On 13 April 1992 at 3:20 am, a 5.3 Mw quake with its epicentre 4 km southwest of Roermond, the Netherlands, and its hypocentre 18 km deep shook the border region for 15 seconds. 30 people were injured in North Rhine-Westphalia alone, mostly by falling roof tiles and chimneys, and there was considerable damage to buildings. Ground shifts of up to 2 m occurred, and sand fountains in a few locations. The quake was felt as far away as Milan and London. The worst damage in Germany was in Heinsberg; in the Netherlands the area of damage extended several kilometres northwest of Roermond. Total damage costs in Germany topped 150 million DM, in the Netherlands, 170 million guilders. Aftershocks continued until 31 May.

2009 Moers earthquake
The Geological Service of North Rhine-Westphalia announced the connection with mining confirmed by a 3.1 magnitude aftershock on 31 July 2009.

2011 Koblenz earthquake
A 4.4 magnitude earthquake struck western Germany on 14 February 2011, at 13:43 local time.  The earthquake epicenter was at Nassau an der Lahn,  WNW from Frankfurt am Main. There were no immediate reports of damage.

Other earthquakes in Germany

References

Germany geology-related lists
Germany
Lists of disasters in Germany